The Bolivian Red Cross was officially founded in Bolivia on 15 May 1917 by Dr. Juan Manuel Balcazar. It has its headquarters in La Paz.

History
The Ambulances of the Army was established as a result of the War of the Pacific (1879–1884), when a call was put forth for midwives to organize supplies and help attend the wounded of the war. Among the first volunteers were Ana M. de Dalence, María N. vda. de Meza and her daughter Mercedes Meza, Vicenta Paredes Mier, Andrea Rioja de Bilbao, and Ignacia Zeballos Taborga. During the administration of President Hilarión Daza, one of his ministers, Tomás Frias Plenipotentiary Minister of Bolivia in Spain, initiated the organization of the Red Cross of Bolivia on 16 October 1879, and agreed to have the organization adhere to the provisions of the Geneva Convention of 1864. Doctor Zenón Dalence was placed in charge of the service and drafted regulations for the establishment of field hospitals. Dalence commissioned Vicenta Paredes Mier, as the Inspector of the Field Kitchen and named Rosaura Rodríguez, as official cook. Andrea Bilbao was the first nurse to wear the emblem of the Red Cross into battle, but Ignacia Zeballos, who has been named "the mother of soldiers" was the initiator of red cross nursing.

Foundation of the Red Cross of Bolivia 
The official establishment of the organization occurred on 15 May 1917, when a group of female teachers from the Liceo Señoritas Venezuela, in La Paz, under the direction of Professor Natural History and Science Dr. Juan Manuel Balcázar. when he was only 23 years old and had just graduated from medical school, he founded the Red Cross of Bolivia as a volunteer organization to collaborate with the Public Health Service and the army and drew-up bylaws for the organization. The foundation of the institution is published in the University Scientific Page of the newspaper El Hombre Libre. 

Its statutes reflected the will to provide voluntary health services, public charity and collaborate with military health. They were approved by the State on October 30, 1918, at that time Dr. Juan Manuel Balcázar pointed out that "Indeed, almost all the objectives (CRB), tend to save or improve the health of the unfortunate, to remedy indigence, dependent poverty of multiple causes, deficiencies in public hygiene services, etc., are included in its statute. Particularly, its purpose is to collaborate with military health, in times of war; educate themselves and prepare necessary material, in time of peace”. The following year, the School of Nurses of the Red Cross was established.

Dr. Juan Manuel Balcázar, directed the Bolivian Red Cross for a short period of time, during that period, the following year, he founded the Red Cross Nurses School, whose operation was approved by the government on February 21, 1918, and created the title of Lady of the Red Cross. One of the first students of the first aid courses was María Josefa Saavedra, who attended them at the request of Dr. Juan Manuel Balcázar. Saavedra was the first to graduate as a lawyer in Bolivia, in addition to being a Minister of the Supreme Court of Justice.

Recognition by the International Committee of the Red Cross for the Bolivian Red Cross occurred on 10 January 1923, and the organization became the 50th national society of the federation when it joined the International Federation of Red Cross and Red Crescent Societies on 22 January 1923.  In 1963 the Bolivian Red Cross received the highest national distinction when it was awarded the Order of the Condor of the Andes by the government.

Founding Act 
The founding act of the Bolivian Red Cross says: “In the city of La Paz, at the Liceo de Señoritas, at 4 pm on May 15, 1917, they met at the initiative and insinuation of Dr. Juan Manuel Balcázar, Professor of Natural History of the establishment, the director Andrée Dobois Niboyet, Miss Rosa Infante, professors of History and Geography; Mercedes Frías, of Drawing; Sara Pascoe, from Gymnastics; Rita Frias, secretary; and the students of the 4th, 5th and 6th courses, Miss Rosa Aparicio, Antonia Aramayo, Raquel Bello, Avis von Boeck, Carmen Rosa Bozo, Eloísa Catacora, Marina David, María Teresa Granier, Esther Lanza Q., María Montes R, Enriqueta Pacheco, Esther Perou, Bethsabe Salmón Cristina Tejada, Sara Villalobos, Nemésia Zeballos and Enriqueta Zorrilla, with the aim of founding a society that, with the name of the Bolivian Red Cross, aims to collaborate with the public health service and very particular with the National Army”.

Awards and Distinctions to Dr. Juan Manuel Balcazar 
Founder of the Bolivian Red Cross. Founder of the School of Nursing of the Bolivian Red Cross. Director of the Public Clinic of the Bolivian Red Cross.

Juan Manuel Balcázar was appointed Honorary Counselor of the Bolivian Red Cross. He attended on behalf of the Bolivian Red Cross as a Delegate to the X General Council of Governors of the Red Cross in Geneva (1922). Delegate to the Second Pan American Conference of the Red Cross (Washington). Delegate of the International Red Cross to inspect Paraguayan prisoners in concentration camps during the Chaco War. Government commissioner to attend the III Pan-American Conference of the Red Cross, held in Rio de Janeiro after the war.

Designated Honorary Member of the Red Cross of Brazil, Costa Rica and Colombia. Designated Delegate of the Red Cross of Peru and Costa Rica before the Bolivian Red Cross.

On October 13, 1947, by Supreme Decree No. 913, "Dr. Juan Manuel Balcázar, was honored in the rank of Grand Officer with the National Decoration of the Order of the Condor of the Andes, for his outstanding work in the country's public health and the Foundation of the Bolivian Red Cross

References

External links
Bolivian Red Cross
Official Red Cross Web Site 

Red Cross and Red Crescent national societies
1917 establishments in Bolivia
Medical and health organisations based in Bolivia
Organizations established in 1917
La Paz